Tilen Nagode (born 21 March 1996) is a Slovenian footballer who plays for ND Primorje.

Career
On 8 July 2019, ND Primorje confirmed that Nagode has joined the club from ND Bilje.

References

External links
PrvaLiga profile 

1996 births
Living people
Slovenian footballers
Association football forwards
ND Gorica players
Slovenian PrvaLiga players
Slovenian Second League players
Slovenia under-21 international footballers